Persia, or Iran, is a country in Western Asia.

Persia may also refer to:

Places
 The Achaemenid Empire (550 B.C. to 330 B.C.), an ancient Iranian empire based in Western Asia and founded by Cyrus the Great.
 The Sasanian Empire (224–661)
 The Tahirid dynasty (821–873)
 The Alavid dynasty (864–928)
 The Saffarid dynasty (861–1003)
 The Samanid Empire (875–999)
 The Timurid dynasty (1369–1507)
Timurid Empire
 The Safavid dynasty (1501–1736)
Safavid Iran
 The Qajar dynasty (1785–1925)
Qajar Iran
 The Pahlavi dynasty (1925–1979)
Pahlavi Iran
 Persia proper, a region located to the southwest of modern Iran (now Fars Province)
 Pars (Sasanian province)
 Greater Iran
 Persia, Iowa, a U.S. city
 Persia, New York, a U.S. town
 Persia, Tennessee, a U.S. unincorporated community

Other uses
Persia (name), a Greek and Latin name for Iran
Persia gens, an ancient Roman family
Persia (trilobite)
Persia (EP), a 1984 EP by The Church
RMS Persia, a steamship built in 1856
SS Persia, various steamships by this name
Persia, the Magic Fairy, a 1984 anime series

See also
Persian (disambiguation)
Farsi (disambiguation)
Parsi (disambiguation)
Persis (disambiguation)
Persian Empire (disambiguation)
Pars (disambiguation)
Fars (disambiguation)
Parsa (disambiguation)
List of Persia-related topics
Prince of Persia, a video game franchise